Abraham Klein may refer to:

A. M. Klein (1909–1972), Canadian poet, journalist, novelist, short story writer and lawyer
Abraham Klein (physicist) (1927–2003), American theoretical physicist at the University of Pennsylvania
Abraham Klein (referee) (born 1934), Israeli international football referee